Peja is a city and municipality located in the District of Peja of Kosovo.

Peja may also refer to:
District of Peja, Kosovo
KB Peja, a Kosovan basketball team
Peja (priest), (fl. 1515–23), n Eastern Orthodox priest 
Peja (rapper) or Ryszard Andrzejewski (born 1976), Polish rapper

People with the given name
Peja Lindholm (born 1970), Swedish curler
Peja Stojaković (born 1977), Serbian basketball player